Vice Admiral Piet Loedolff is a retired South African Navy officer and author.

He joined the Navy in 1964 and obtained a Bachelor in Military Science (B. Mil) degree at the South African Military Academy. He served as Chief of Staff Personnel from 1994 till his retirement in 1999.

In 1992 then Commodore Loedolff, serving as Director Service Systems at Personnel Division, was promoted to rear admiral and assigned as Chief Director Manpower Maintenance.

References

South African admirals
Living people
South African writers
Year of birth missing (living people)